Călugăreasa River may refer to:

 Călugăreasa, a tributary of the Băiaș in Vâlcea County
 Călugăreasa, a tributary of the Câlnic in Gorj County

See also 
 Călugărul River (disambiguation)
 Izvorul Călugărului River (disambiguation)
 Călugăreni (disambiguation)